Ruben Papian (born June 6, 1962 in Yerevan, Armenia) is an innovator and life coach. He is a developer of unique self-improvement methods.

Biography
Ruben Papian was born in  Yerevan, Armenia. In Armenia, Ruben attended the Yerevan State University of Architecture and Construction. In addition to this he was also interested in painting and music. His musical career began when he was 12 years old. Ruben is the founder, leader and singer of a student rock band called Oleess that projects progressive ideas.

In 1987 Ruben was invited to move to Moscow. His energy healing abilities were highly appreciated by Soviet Union State Department officials. During the time he spent in Moscow, he developed new methods to increase the efficiency and regeneration of the nervous system and mind functions. He has concentrated his work on understanding the functionality of mind, as it was the key to solving health issues. The method called “Mental Correction and Communication” was developed.

In 1988 he was invited to visit Yugoslavia to solve a certain health problem. After a few visits, in 1990 Ruben moved to Belgrade, Yugoslavia with his family and formed a “Center for Alternative Healing” where he performed personal and group treatments using his methods. By 1993 his knowledge had become enriched by understand human complexity and led to the establishment of the association for individual harmonic development “The Golden Step”.

In 1994, he moved to the Netherlands, and until 1998 he continued his energy healing practice, mentored different courses, worked in an International company as a negotiation trainer for high management.

From 1998 to 2005 the name Ruben Papian became well known worldwide. In 2005 “The Golden Step” was transferred into the “Institute of Esotery and Parapsychology” in Belgrade, Yugoslavia. The Institute offered educational programs such as Energy Therapy Healing, Mental Correction and Communication and Harmonic Personal Development.

In 2004 Ruben devoted his time to understanding esoterica and hidden abilities of space and matter, which led to construction of “The Energy Pyramid”. In a short time, Ruben developed an energy flow concept by understanding the basis of the mystical powers of those large monuments that could be found anywhere in the world. At the very start of 2011, the “Institute of Esotery and Parapsychology Ruben Papian” in Belgrade, Serbia became the “SFERA movement”.

In 2004 Ruben devoted his time to understanding esoterica and hidden abilities of space and matter, which led to construction of “The Energy Pyramid”. In a short time, Ruben developed an energy flow concept by understanding the basis of the mystical powers of those large monuments that could be found anywhere in the world.

In 2011 he wrote his first book, How to Wish. This book is in the first part of a transformational series called “The Books of Essence”.  The book was published in June 2013. In 2015 he wrote two more books called “To Feel” and “To Think”.

Ruben's lifelong work is aimed at understanding the human being and its life, and to help the individual in its road to success. In 2016 Ruben discovered and systemized the esoteric possibilities of a space called ezo-house, which forms energy states based on the individual mental and emotional needs.

In 2015 Ruben discovered metaphysical abilities of wood cells which led to the design of the first ezo-guitar “Leopard”. “I have a system for my alchemy. My associates are also alchemists who think the same way I do. And science is extremely important here, it is the essence of everything. When I say “ezo” I mean that I have found the possibility of manipulating the effects of a substance known as ether. Sound is not only a sound, but the way a substance behaves. The effects of playing ezo guitar are space filled with specific sound and a man filled with that sound, which awakens a sea of inspiring emotions. This ezo guitar is an invention in the field of entertainment, where the effect on a human being is the only thing that matters.” 

During the following years several series of guitars were built. In 2017 Papian ezo-guitars were presented in Music china. 

In January 2018 ezo-guitars were presented at the NAMM exhibition in LA. Details of the collections can be read on the official exhibition website. 

Ruben’s newest invention is an ezo-supplement called “Self-confidence”. It is the supplement that boosts energy levels, determination and increases productivity and concentration.

References

External links
Ruben's article archive
Ruben Papian portfolio

1962 births
Living people
Spiritualists
Folk healers
Spiritual teachers
Parapsychologists
People from Yerevan